Charrería is a sport and discipline arising from equestrian activities and livestock traditions used in the haciendas of old Mexico.

Evolving from the traditions brought from Spain, most specifically the municipality of Salamanca in the 16th century, the first kind of charreria events were ranch work competitions between haciendas. The first shows related to charreria began before the 20th century, but it was not until the Mexican Revolution that its full emergence occurred in Hidalgo and Jalisco when with the Land Reform, charros began to congregate in cities such as Mexico City and other centers, consolidating large associations to maintain tradition and popularity; The most important are the Asociación de Charros de Jalisco A.C, Asociación de Charros de Morelia A.C and Asociación de Charros Regionales de La Villa A.C. Charreria is the national sport of Mexico by excellence and in 2016, and was inscribed in the Representative List of the Intangible Cultural Heritage of Humanity by UNESCO.

History

 In the 16th century, when the Spanish first settled in Mexico, they brought 16 horses with them. They were under orders to raise horses and prohibit any non-Spaniards from riding them. However, soon the Spanish had very large cattle-raising estates and found it necessary to loosen up the restrictions. Haciendas in the state of Hidalgo were some of the first places where restrictions were lifted and a larger number of people were exposed to equestrianism.

The Mexican cattlemen of the late 19th and 20th centuries dedicated to raising and herding cattle as part of their work were developing playful cattle handling techniques that would later become a sport.

The cattlemen would be tasked to do several jobs around the ranch such as hunting down runaway cattle, ranch sorting for livestock branding and pinning down bulls and horses. These jobs were the early versions of the charro events.

Prior to the Mexican Revolution, ranch work competitions were generally between haciendas but following the breakup of the haciendas by the Mexican Revolution, the charro traditions were slowly being lost so charros from around the country organized to meet in 1921 and formed the Asociación Nacional de Charros to keep the charrería tradition alive.

In 1920 (The year the Mexican Revolution ended), Silvano Barba, Inés Ramírez and Andrés Zemeño, created in Guadalajara the first Mexican charrería group, called Charros de Jalisco.

The advent of the Mexican cinema brought greater popularity, especially musicals which combined rancheras with the charro image, akin to the Western and "singing cowboy" genres in the United States.

Mexican Americans in the United States also held various charreadas during the same period, but beginning in the 1970s, the Federación Mexicana de Charrería (FMCH) began assisting them in establishing official charreadas north of the border. At times, US champion teams compete in the national competition of Mexico.

Lienzo charro 

A lienzo charro is a specially designed facility for the practice of horse riding. This is the arena where charros hold the events of charreadas and jaripeos.

Charro horse 

It is said that the ideal horse for charrería is the American Quarter Horse. Another outstanding breed for charrería events is the Azteca horse. The American Quarter Horse breed traces back to the 17th century, and the creation of the Azteca horse was in 1972 in the Mexican high school of horsemen in Rancho San Antonio, Texcoco. The Azteca horse was bred specifically for charros. Both of these horse breeds are well-suited for the intricate and quick maneuvers required in reining, cutting, working cow horse, barrel racing, calf roping, and other western riding events, especially those involving live cattle.

Clothing and Horse Tack

Men 

There are five types of attire that the charro may own. They are the working, half-gala, gala,  grand gala, and etiquette. The most commonly used attire is the working uniform. This is the suit that is worn in the competitions. The grand gala uniform is the most layered. It will come complete with a felt charro sombrero with silver and gold embroidery, and the jacket and pants are of fine cashmere with silver buttons. The working uniform is the most simple. It includes a plain button up shirt, a bow, pants, boots and a palm leaf charro sombrero.

Women 

Unlike men's charro attire, the women in charreria only have 3 outfits, with the china poblana outfit being used for all types of events. The china poblana outfit consists of a low-cut blouse with short sleeves, embroidered with silk, beads or colored sequins, and a cloth or flannel skirt with at least one ruffle, embroidered with beads or sequins, with layers of lace visible at the bottom of the skirt. The use of a petticoat is indispensable. Silk shoes with buckles are used to match the embroidery of the skirt. Shawl is used to match the color of the skirt. A fine, felt charro hat with suede, gold and/or silver chapetas is the topper. Sash is used at the waist, tied in a bow at the back. Also, women must have their hair pulled back in a low bun, usually adorned with a fabric or lace bow, or two braids decorated with ribbons.

Although the china poblana outfit is used for most performances, there are three different attires the escaramuza charras use, the adelita, the charra de faena (“working” attire) and the china poblana.

Horses 
 The equipment for the horse has to meet specifications, just as the charro's clothing must. All equipment on the saddle must be made of natural materials, not man-made such as plastic. There are primarily two types of saddles that the charro owns: the working saddle and the formal saddle.

The saddle of the charro has a wider horn than that of a western saddle, which helps safeguard the charro from being pitched off or hung up. There are two grips at the back of the saddle, in case the charro needs to hold on because of an unexpected act of the horse.

All charros must comply with regulation for the practice of their sport and clothing. They even have a rigorous protocol to initiate celebrations and team meetings.

Sportsmen

Charro 

The charro, is the male rider who practices charrería, and is also oftentimes the national icon for Mexico. The modern charro evolved from a long line of mexican horsemen. Dating back to the Spanish conquest, the Mexican vaqueros paved the way for chinacos, a liberal informal military that fought in the Mexican War of Independence, which later gave birth to the charros around the Mexican Revolution.

The word charro, was originally used to identify the natives of Salamanca, in Spain, in a place known as campo charro. In Mexico, the term became synonymous with horse rider.

Although in modern times, the only people that are technically a charro are men who practice charreria, the look of this figure has expanded to music and film. Mariachi bands very often sport a Gran Gala charro-esc outfit, since mariachi music has become synonymous with the charreada, but these musicians do not classify as technical charros and the outfits they wear are for look rather than practicality.

Escaramuza charra 

The women who practice this sport are called charras, since the term escaramuza is used to name the set of ladies that make up the sports team, and it is not the correct term to refer to a charra in the singular.

The female part of charreria, the escaramuza charra, is said to originate from the Altos de Jalisco. Specifically, from Tepatitlán de Morelos. Their clothing is adelita styled china poblana outfits which originate from the state of Puebla and they do tricks with the horse, accompanied by an artistic touch, with samples such as la coladera, combinado, la escalera and la flor.

Although within the National Association of Charros, the escaramuza charra is said to be created by Mr. Everardo Camacho and instructor Luis Ortega in 1953, which was made up of young girls and boys who were between five and nine years old. This first escaramuza was made up of siblings Guadalupe, Antonio and José Camacho, as well as Luis, Arturo and María Eugenia Ruiz Loredo. As it was something innovative at that time. It was very successful, since in that presentation the children demonstrated their skill when riding in the charro style and the education of their horses.

An escaramuza charra is made up of eight members and its presentation consists of 12 exercises which are at high speed and consist of making crosses and turns, which demonstrates the skill that the ladies have to ride and the good rein of their horses. Dresses can vary in color in pairs, quartets, or individual.

The training of the escaramuza charra is very intense, since they must be able to control their horses with great skill, since their evolutions require perfect coordination between all the members of the same team.

Events

Cala de Caballo 

This event is the demonstration of the good rein and education of the charro horse. This event includes: good governance, stirrup, meekness, gait, gallop, run, eyebrow and head and tail postures. It consists of the horse running at full speed and braking in a single time and this is called tip. Then come the sides where the horse has to rotate on its own axis supported by a single leg like this towards both sides. Next come the half sides where the charro must do the same, but in the middle. At the end of this event, the charro must walk back to the fifty meter line. This event is done within the 20 x 6 meter rectangle section of the lienzo.

This charro event is considered one of the most important within the national sport par excellence, since it demonstrates the connection (communication) that exists between the charro (rider) and the horse. It is considered one of the hardest events to master and also comes with the most elaborately scoring. It is possible to score more negative points than positive ones. It was officially consummated as a national sport in the 20th century. Likewise, it is shown if the horse is comfortable or is uncomfortable with some type of harness that is used for its handling.

Piales 

This event consists of tying the hind legs of a mare (female horse) and with this stopping the gallop of the mare completely. The charro, while mounted on his horse, must throw a lasso, let the mare run through the loop, catching it by the hind legs, then wrapping his rope on the head of his saddle to squirt it as necessary, gradually reducing the speed of the mare until it comes to a complete stop. During the performance of this event, the charro must be careful of correctly looping the rope and not causing knots to prevent major hand injuries. Three opportunities are given. Points are awarded for distance needed to stop the mare. This is done in the rectangular portion of the arena.

There are different types of piales, some of them are the pial de piquete, pial floreado, and the pial de chaqueta. The pial de piquete consists of having the lasso to the ground and when the mare passes, lasso it with force towards the hind legs of the mare, the pial floreado consists of making a small “floreando” (rope trick) just before the mare passes and when the animal passes, throw it at the hind legs and the pial de chaqueta consists of positioning the charro with his horse with his back to where the mare will pass and making an opposite swirl so that when the mare passes, he places the rope on the hind legs of the mare.

Colas en el Lienzo 

This event (also known as coleadero), consists of trying to bring down a small bull by its tail while it runs. This task is similar to steer wrestling, except that the rider does not dismount. A charro mounted on his horse will wait at the gate of the chute for the exit of a bull, which after greeting and strutting, the charro will ride next to the bull, hold it by its tail and wrap the tail around his leg, eventually trying to bring the bull down to the ground, carrying out all these actions in a maximum distance of 60 meters.

Jineteo de toro 

This event consist of bull riding. The goal is for the rider to stay mounted on a bull until it stops bucking. One or two hands can be used on the bullrope and the charro is able to have up to three assistants inside arena to support the bull's head, tighten and hold the rider's belt. The charro performing this event will give the indication so that the bucking chute is opened. The performance begins when the judges give the order to count the time for tightening, and ends when the bull stops bucking. That is when the rider has 3 minutes to dismount. Every minute saved counts as a point and points are also rewarded for technique. The charro cannot buck off and must dismount and land upright. After the charro dismounts the bull, he must remove the bullrope and bellrope so the Terna en el Ruedo can follow. This event has its roots in an earlier form known as Jaripeo.

Terna en el ruedo 

This event is a team roping event in which three charros attempt to rope a bull - one by its neck, one by its hind legs, and the last then ties its feet together all in a maximum time limit of 6 minutes. Points are awarded for rope tricks and time. The charros have two opportunities each, either to lasso the head of the bull or tread it, the charros will alternate turns, after the first charro gives an attempt then, the second will try and then the third, and so on until their opportunities or their minutes are exhausted. The charro who is roping the bull's neck needs to demonstrate full rope control by performing some rope tricks called “floreando”. While one rope is wrapped around the bull's neck, the other team members need to put a trap to tie the hind legs and then finally bring the bull down.

Jineteo de yegua 

This event is similar to Bareback bronc riding. Yegua means mare. An untrained horse, often a mare, is ridden with a bullrope. Two hands are used and the legs are held horizontally to the ground. Similarly to the bull riding event, riders attempt to stay on the horse until it stops bucking. The mare will be encased and with a team of assistants who also dress as charros. Up to two grippers stretch the bucking strap. Up to three assistants inside support the mare's head, tighten and hold the rider by the belt, so that he can mount the horse and be accommodated. He will give the indication to open the bucking chute. The task begins at the moment the judges give the order to count the time for tightening, and ends when the charro dismounts for any reason.

Manganas a pie o a caballo 

Manganas a Pie consist of a charro on foot (pie) given three opportunities and eight minutes to rope a horse with his lasso by its front legs and cause it to fall and roll once. The charro manganeador can be located anywhere in the arena at a minimum distance of four meters from the perimeter fence. After flourishing his rope (doing rope tricks), the charro lances his lasso at his target which is the lone horse which struts alongside 3 other horses that are being mounted by other charros, trying to not catch any of the 3 other horses. Manganas a Caballo is a similar concept but instead on horseback.

Points are awarded for time and rope tricks as long as the horse is roped according to the national rules. Points for all three attempts are cumulative. The time to execute the manganas both on foot and on horseback will be 8 minutes. The timer will stop for the first change of mare, as well as by accident or because the mare jumps or leaves the ring. The timer for subsequent mare changes.

Paso de la muerte 

This event called The pass of death in Spanish consist of a charro riding bareback with reins attempting to leap from his own horse to the bare back of a loose, unbroken horse without reins and ride it until it stops running. The events gets its name from the high amount of risk of the performance if done incorrectly since this movement can be fatal for the person who executes it since they can fall under the animal and be trampled by the three other riders who herd the animal. This is done backwards at times for show.

Performance

In the opening ceremony, organizations and participants parade into the arena (the lienzo) on horseback, usually accompanied by a mariachi band or banda playing Marcha Zacatecas and rendering honors to the Mexican flag. This signifies the long tradition of Charros being an auxiliary arm of the Mexican Army. The short charro jacket is reminiscent of that worn by members of Villa's Army.

The charreada itself consists of nine scoring events staged in a particular order (nine for the men and one for the women). Two or more teams, called asociaciones (associations), compete against each other. Teams can compete to become state, regional, and national champions. The competitors are judged by both style and execution.

A playout of a charreada will usually follow the order of:

 Cala de Caballo (Testing of the Horse) - Men's event
 Piales en Lienzo (Roping of the Feet) - Men's event
 Colas en el Lienzo, or Coleadero (Bull tailing) - Men's event
 Escaramuza (Women Skirmish) - Women's events
 Jineto de Toro (Bull Riding) - Men's event
 Terna en el Ruedo (Team of Three) - Men's event
 Jineteo de Yegua (Wild Mare Bronc Riding) - Men's event
 Manganas a Pie (On Feet Roping) - Men's event
 Manganas a Caballo (Horseback Roping) - Men's event
 El Paso de la Muerte (The Pass of Death) - Men's event

National Charro Championship and Congress 

The National Charro Championship and Congress (Congreso y Campeonato Nacional Charro in Spanish) is a 17-day event where charro and escaramuza teams from all of Mexico and the United States compete at a national level organized by the Mexican Federation of Charreria.

In 2021, over 150 teams competed in the host city of Aguascalientes. Team Rancho El Quevedeño from the state of Nayarit were the national grand champions of 2021 with a final score of 330 points, Team Rancho Las Cuatas, also from Nayarit, were the runner-ups with 312 points, and Team Charros de La Laguna “A” from the state of Durango were in third place with 303 points. Team Soles del Desierto from the state of Chihuahua were crowned national escaramuza queens with 309.33 points, Team Sanmarqueña from Aguascalientes were the runner-ups with 306.66 points, and third place was E.M.T Rancho El Herradero from Jalisco with 290.66 points. José Andrés Aceves Aceves from Nayarit, was titled 2021 King of Charros Completos. The formal award ceremony was headed by the Constitutional Governor of the State of Aguascalientes, C.P. Martín Orozco Sandoval in front of a plethora of San Marcos Arena where the governor also congratulated the 144 teams, 112 escaramuzas and 16 charros completos that participated from all 32 states of Mexico and other countries.

Prizes for charreria championships can include things such as saddles, horse trailers, trophies or sometimes money. Although most charros do it without an economic incentive (in fact they end up paying to charrear, as happens in other amateur sports), there are people who fully dedicate themselves to charreria and live from it. The salary of a professional charro is variable. A charro can earn up to 20 or 25 thousand mexican pesos a month.

Teams and associations 

The charros are grouped into associations registered in the Federación Mexicana de Charrería (Mexican Federation of Charrería founded on December 16, 1933). Such associations are teams or squads in which the charros are organized for practices and competitions, and on some occasions to raise funds for the construction or purchase of facilities. Escaramuzas (women charro groups) are organized in a similar fashion where it is made up of eight official members and each participant must belong to the Mexican Federation of Charrería and comply with the norms established by the institution. In order to compete in a charreada, all associations must be licensed by the federation, and competitors must be certified as charros. There are presently over 100 charro associations in the United States.

Anthem 

On Sunday, October 14, 2012, within the framework of the inauguration of the LXIII National Charro Congress in Zacatecas, the Governor of the State, Miguel Alonso Reyes and the president of the Mexican Federation of Charrería, Jaime Castruita Padilla, signed the agreement in which the Mexican Federation of Charrería adopted the lyrics and music of the "Marcha Zacatecas" as the National Charro Anthem. A song composed by Genaro Codina in 1892.

See also

Charro
Lienzo charro
Charro outfit
Escaramuza charra
Jaripeo
Mariachi
Banda music
List of equestrian sports

References

External links

Federation USA (English)
Federación Mexicana de Charrería (Spanish)
Asociación Nacional de Charros (Spanish)
Circuito Excelenia Charra (Spanish)
 ESCARAMUZA: Riding from the Heart, 2012 documentary film co-produced by Robin Rosenthal and Bill Yahraus about Charreada and Escaramuza. Shown on the Voces PBS TV series in the United States. The film features Las Azaleas, a Mexican-American team.

 
Mexican culture
Sport in Mexico
Sports originating in Mexico
Equestrian sports in Mexico